Danza (April 17, 2011 – June 23, 2021) was an American Thoroughbred racehorse who won the 2014 Arkansas Derby.

Career

On July 12, 2013, Danza competed in and won his first race at Belmont Park.

Danza would not see victory again until April 12, 2014, at the Grade 1 2014 Arkansas Derby.

Danza's last race took place on May 3, 2014, when he came in 3rd at the 2014 Kentucky Derby.

Danza died of an apparent heart attack on June 23, 2021.

Pedigree

References

2011 racehorse births
2021 racehorse deaths
Racehorses bred in Kentucky
Racehorses trained in the United States
Thoroughbred family 8-d